NGC 5643 is an intermediate spiral galaxy in the constellation Lupus. Based on the tip of the red-giant branch distance indicator, it is located at a distance of about 40 million light-years (12.5 megaparsecs). NGC 5643 has an active galactic nucleus and is a type II Seyfert galaxy.

Observation history 
The galaxy was first discovered by James Dunlop on May 10, 1826, with his 9-inch reflector telescope, who described it as exceedingly faint. The galaxy was also spotted by John Herschel and added to the General Catalogue of Nebulae and Clusters as number 3572. The galaxy is located only 15 degrees from the galactic plane.

Structure 
NGC 5643 is a grand design spiral galaxy, with two well-defined, symmetric arms. In the circumnuclear region are other dust spirals, but the two main dust arms are wider. The galaxy is seen nearly face on, at an inclination of ∼ 27°.

Active galactic nucleus 

The galaxy has a low-luminosity active galactic nucleus of Seyfert 2 type and is also a luminous infrared galaxy. The galaxy has a double sided diffuse radiojet. The galaxy exhibits an extended emission line region elongated in a direction close to the radio position angle of 87°±3°. Chris Simpson et al. analysed images takes from the WFPC2 camera of the Hubble Space Telescope in [O III] λ5007 and Hα and found emission extending eastward for at least 1.8 kpc and in the [O III]/Hα map a well-defined V-shaped structure that they identified as the projection of a tridimensional ionisation cone, which shares the same axis with the radio emission. A dust lane perpendicular to this axis obstructs the nucleus from direct view. A disk of material was found when the data cubes of VLT were analysed. It is aligned with the nucleus and circles it and possibly provides gas to the active galactic nucleus. The mass of the supermassive black hole has been estimated based on the galaxy stellar velocity dispersion to be 106.4 M⊙. It has been proposed that the gas outflow has led to star formation on two locations on the bar of the galaxy which lie at the location where the gas from the nucleus encounters the dense material of the bar.

Via observations of the galaxy from the XMM Newton telescope in 2009, the galaxy is found to have a Compton–thick active galactic nucleus. Also the galaxy emits soft X-rays, mainly from photoionized matter. The presence of the compton-thick column which obstructs the nucleus was confirmed from observations by NuSTAR.

Ultraluminous X-ray source 
In 2004, Guainazzi et al. detected in the images from XMM-Newton an ultraluminous X-ray source, named NGC 5643 ULX1, located within 0.8 arcminutes from the nucleus. The source outshone the nucleus in X-rays and if it is located within NGC 5643 its luminosity is over 1040 erg/s. Its luminosity is variable. The X-rays could be produced either by an advection dominated disc or a Comptonising corona and the X-ray source is considered to be a black hole of stellar origin of approximately 30 solar masses.

Supernovae 
NGC 5643 has been the home of two supernovae, SN 2013aa and SN 2017cbv. SN 2013aa was discovered by Stuart Parker from New Zealand on a 30-s unfiltered CCD image taken on 13.621 UT February 2013, as part of the Backyard Observatory Supernova Search, at magnitude 11.9. It was classified as a Type Ia a few days before maximum brightness.

SN 2017cbv was discovered on March 10, 2017, by the Swope 1-m telescope at Las Campanas Observatory and was classified as a very young Ia supernova. It increased in magnitude from 15.8 to 14.8 within the next day.

Nearby galaxies 
NGC 5643 has a satellite dwarf galaxy, ESO 273-014. NGC 5643 is the foremost member of a small galaxy group that also includes NGC 5530.

References

External links 

Barred spiral galaxies
Seyfert galaxies
Lupus (constellation)
5643
51969